Theo Constanté Parra (May 11, 1934 in Guayaquil, Ecuador – April 27, 2014) was a master Latin American painter part of the Abstract Informalist Movement in Ecuador.  In 2005, Constanté won the country's most prestigious award for art, literature and culture, the Premio Eugenio Espejo National Award, presented by the President of Ecuador.  Constanté's works are abstract in nature and consist of many colors which meld together amongst loosely drawn geometric lines.  Constanté stated that his favorite colors were red, orange and blue and they are the colors that are typically more dominant in his work.

Constanté studied and later taught at the School of Fine Arts in Guayaquil and in the Academy of San Fernando of Madrid. In 1963, Constanté's works were represented at the Museum of Modern Art in Paris for the Third Biennial of Paris together with fellow Ecuadorian painters Enrique Tábara and Humberto Moré.  The work of Constanté can be found in galleries, museums and collections throughout Guayaquil, Quito, Lima, Cali, São Paulo, Miami, New York, Paris and Madrid.

Notable Exhibits, Awards & Medals
 1955 - Municipality of Guayaquil
 1960 - Salon de Julio, Guayaquil, Ecuador
 1961 - Salon de Julio, Guayaquil, Ecuador
 1962 - Salon de Julio, Guayaquil, Ecuador
 1962 - Salon de October, Guayaquil, Ecuador
 1963 - Salon de Julio, Guayaquil, Ecuador
 1963 - Third Biennial of Paris, Museum of Modern Art, Paris, France
 1964 - Salon de Julio, Guayaquil, Ecuador
 1967 - First Prize of the First Biennial of Quito
 1969 - X Bienal de San Pablo, Museo de Arte Moderno, Buenos Aires, Argentina
 1969 - X Bienal de São Paulo, São Paulo, Brazil
 1979 - XV Bienal Internacional de São Paulo, São Paulo, Brazil
 2005 - Premio Eugenio Espejo National Award, for artistic contributions to Ecuadorian culture, presented by the President of Ecuador.

References

 Hernán Rodriguez Castelo, "Panorama of the Art", Ecuadorian Library of the Family, no. 9, Ministry of Education and Culture of Ecuador, Edit. National Publishing corporation, House of the Ecuadorian Culture.
 Salvat, Arte Contemporáneo de Ecuador. Salvat Editores Ecuatoriana, S.A., Quito, Ecuador, 1977.
 Arte Ecuatoriano, Salvat, Volume IV.
 Municipalidad de Guayaquil

1934 births
2014 deaths
Ecuadorian painters
Modern painters
People from Guayaquil